Fiona Watt is a British children's author who has written over 100 books. She is best known for her That's Not My... series. From 2000 to 2009, she sold 2,431,376 copies in the UK, with a value of £14.1 million.

Watt has a bachelor's degree from Exeter University.

References

Alumni of the University of Exeter
British children's writers
Living people
British women children's writers
20th-century British writers
20th-century British women writers
21st-century British writers
21st-century British women writers
Year of birth missing (living people)